
Year 667 (DCLXVII) was a common year starting on Friday (link will display the full calendar) of the Julian calendar. The denomination 667 for this year has been used since the early medieval period, when the Anno Domini calendar era became the prevalent method in Europe for naming years.

Events 
 By place 
 Byzantine Empire 
 Arab–Byzantine War: Caliph Muawiyah I launches a series of attacks against Byzantine holdings in Africa, Sicily and the East.

 Europe 
 The Lombards, under King Grimoald I, destroy Oderzo (Northern Italy). Much of its population flees to the nearby city of Heraclea.

 Arabian Empire 
 King Javanshir of Caucasian Albania (modern Azerbaijan) revolts against the Muslim-Arabs, but is defeated (approximate date).

 By topic 
 Religion 
 Wighard, archbishop of Canterbury, dies of the bubonic plague while returning from his consecration in Rome.
 The Abbey of St. Vaast in Arras (France) is founded.

Births 
 Hisham ibn Urwah, prominent narrator of hadith and scholar
 Qasim ibn Hasan, son of Hassan ibn Ali

Deaths 
 January 23 – Ildefonsus, bishop of Toledo
 Daoxuan, Chinese Buddhist monk (b. 596) 
 Severus Sebokht, Syrian scholar and bishop 
 Su Dingfang, general of the Tang Dynasty (b. 591)
 Wighard, archbishop of Canterbury (approximate date)

References

Sources